Five O'Clock Bells is a studio album by Canadian jazz guitarist Lenny Breau that was released in 1979.

History
After signing a three-album deal with Gene Rosenthal for Adelphi Records, Breau recorded enough material for this over a few months in 1977. Rosenthal produced the first sessions which would become Five O'Clock Bells. Subsequent releases from these sessions were Mo' Breau and Last Sessions.

Originally released on LP in 1979, it was reissued in 1987 on the Genes label and again reissued along with Mo' Breau.

Reception

In his review for Allmusic, music critic Michael G. Nastos wrote "Guitar students, this is your homework — find this album."

Track listing
"Days of Wine and Roses" (Henry Mancini) – 4:37
"Toronto" (Lenny Breau) – 5:46
"Amy (For Cinde)" (Breau) – 2:26
"Other Places, Other Times" (Breau) – 4:22
"Five O'Clock Bells" (Breau) – 3:15
"Little Blues" (Breau) – 3:44
"My Funny Valentine" (Richard Rodgers) – 6:12
"Visions" (McCoy Tyner) – 6:08

Personnel
Lenny Breau – guitar, vocals on "Five O'Clock Bells"

References

External links
lennybreau.com discography entry

Lenny Breau albums
1979 albums
Adelphi Records albums